Raoul Kouakou (born 3 January 1980 in Abidjan) is an Ivorian former footballer who played as a defender.

Career
During his time in Malmö FF he got the nickname Göken (Swedish for the cuckoo). In a 2006 game against Hammarby IF (his 6th game in the Swedish first league), he scored an own goal and accidentally head butted teammate Christian Järdler, who ended up with a fractured cheekbone.

After his transfer to Sandefjord Fotball in 2007, a knee injury stopped him from playing. Sandefjord claims that Raouls previous club, Malmö FF, withheld information about this injury when the transfer took place. In May 2010 FIFA ruled in favor of MFF and Sandefjord had to pay the transfer fee to Malmö.
While playing in Norway he was dubbed Røde Raoul (Red Raoul) by the tabloid media due to his many red cards.

International career
He has 4 caps for the national team, but was not called up to the 2006 World Cup.

References

1980 births
Living people
Ivorian footballers
Ivory Coast international footballers
Ivorian expatriate footballers
Sogndal Fotball players
Viborg FF players
Malmö FF players
Expatriate footballers in Norway
Expatriate footballers in Sweden
Expatriate men's footballers in Denmark
Sandefjord Fotball players
Ivorian expatriates in Norway
JC d'Abidjan players
Allsvenskan players
Eliteserien players
Footballers from Abidjan
Association football defenders